Alyki is a village of the Thebes municipality. Before the 2011 local government reform it was a part of the municipality of Thisvi. The 2011 census recorded 279 residents in the village. Alyki is a part of the community of Xironomi.

Population
According to the 2011 census, the population of Alyki was 279 people, a figure almost double to that of the previous census of 2001.

See also
 List of settlements in Boeotia

References

Populated places in Boeotia
Villages in Greece